Kanyanya is a neighborhood within the city of Kampala, Uganda's capital.

Location
Kanyanya is bordered by Wakiso District to the north, Mpererwe to the east, Kaleerwe to the south, and Kawempe to the west. The coordinates of Kanyanya are 0°22'25.0"N, 32°34'38.0"E (Latitude:0.373620; Longitude:32.577223).

Overview
Kanyanya is predominantly a middle-class residential area. Small business establishments, such as petrol stations, restaurants and bars, appear at major intersections and along Kampala–Gayaza Road.

Points of interest
The following points of interest lie within or near Kanyanya:
 Kanyanya Police Station - An establishment of the Uganda National Police
 Kampala Quality Primary School - A private, mixed, boarding elementary school
 Tonnet Agro Engineering Company Limited - A company that manufactures agro-processing machinery

See also
 Kampala Capital City Authority
 Kawempe Division
 Kampala District
 Central Region, Uganda

References

External links
 New Music Group Launches In Kanyanya

Neighborhoods of Kampala
Kawempe Division